The Little Dancer is a low-floor tram brand built by Alna Sharyo, a Japanese manufacturer of trams and light rail vehicles.

Overview 
The name "Little Dancer" was  chosen by Alna Sharyo for two reasons, firstly to evoke an image of a lively dancer, and secondly for its similarity to the Japanese word "dansa". "Dansa" in Japanese means "step", pertaining to the step-free access that the trams provide. The result is aimed to evoke an image of a lively, cute, and small tram.

Little Dancer trams feature conventional bogies so that it is easier for railway companies and their maintenance staff  to adjust to the trams when they are introduced.

Type 
There are several variants of the Little Dancer.

Type S 
Type S series are a short body type tram with a single section.
  : Iyo Railway - 2100 series. (10 sets)
  : Iyo Railway - 5000 series. (unknown)
  : Sapporo Streetcar - 1100 series (2 set)
  : Railway Technical Research Institute - LH02 (Test car.) (1 set)

Type L 
Type L series have an articulated three section body.
  : Tosaden Kōtsū - 100 series. (1 set)

Type A 
Type A series adopt 3 or 5 articulated bodies. (Some of the articulations have no bogies and are floating.)
  : Kagoshima City Transportation Bureau - 1000 series (9 sets) and the first Little Dancer type to enter service.
  : Kagoshima City Transportation Bureau - 7000 series (4 sets)

Type U,Ua 
Type S,L,A series weren't 100% low floor, because the motors attached the bogies. U series devises to position the motor. So, U series are 100% low floor. "U" is an initial of "Ultimate".
  : Nagasaki Electric Tramway - 3000 series (3 sets) and 5000 series (3 sets)
  : Toyohashi Railroad - T1000 series (1 set)
  : Toyama Chihō Railway - T100 series (2 sets)
  : Sapporo Streetcar - A1200 series (3 sets)
  : Hankai Tramway - 1001 series (3 sets)
  : Chikuhō Electric Railroad - 5000 series (2 sets)
  : Tosaden Kōtsū - 3000 series (unknown)

Type C 
"C" is an initial of "Combination".
  : Hakodate Transportation Bureau - 9600 series (2 sets)

Type X 
The traction motor is downsized to the limit, and the same driving system as the conventional vehicle is adopted.
  : Kagoshima City Transportation Bureau - 7500 series (unknown)

See also 
In Japan, the three brand compete with Little Dancer.
 Bombardier, ADtranz low floor tram - Niigata Transys has been licensed to make it.
 Siemens, Combino - Hiroshima Electric Railway, Japanese biggest tram company used to use this tram.
 Green Mover Max - This tram was developed in Japan, too. Hiroshima uses this tram, now.

Tram vehicles of Japan